Paul Causey Hurst (October 15, 1888 – February 27, 1953) was an American actor and director.

Career
Born in Traver, California, Hurst was half-Cherokee and half-Seneca. He was raised on a ranch. He appeared in hundreds of films during the 1920s, 1930s and 1940s. However, he got his start painting scenery as part of the backstage crew during the silent movie era. By 1911, he was active in films as an actor, writer and director. He freelanced and worked for many of the movie studios, building a solid reputation for his work both on and off screen.

Hurst is best remembered for two roles: as the Yankee deserter who trespasses at Tara and is shot by Scarlett in Gone with the Wind (1939); and his memorable characterization of the drunken and sadistic vigilante Smith in The Ox Bow Incident (1943).

However, he was most proud of his role as a crotchety, old rancher who refuses water to a Quaker family in the movie Angel and the Badman, until John Wayne's character convinces him to share the water. It was after this latter role that Republic Pictures signed him as the comic sidekick in Monte Hale's Western series. His last film was John Ford's The Sun Shines Bright.

Personal life and death
Hurst was married to actress Hedda Nova. He was diagnosed with terminal cancer in late 1952, and committed suicide on February 27, 1953. He is buried in Reedley Cemetery in Reedley, California.

Filmography

As actor

 Jean of the Jail (1912) - Alcalde
 The Stolen Invention (1912) - John Rawley, a Promoter
 The Outlaw (1912) -  Black Pete
 The Loneliness of the Hills (1912) - The Indian Chief
 When Youth Meets Youth (1912) - Will Thurvell, the Foreman
 The Redskin Raiders (1912) 
 Shannon of the Sixth (1914) - Captain Arlington
 The Invisible Power (1914) - Lorenzo
 The Hazards of Helen (1914) - Benton - a Foreman [Ch. 2]
 The Tragedy on Bear Mountain (1915, Short) - Steve Barty
 The Girl Detective (1915) - (Episode #1, 2, etc.)
 Mysteries of the Grand Hotel (1915)
 The Pitfall (1915) - Garvin - a Crooked Politician
 Stingaree (1915) - Howie - Stingaree's Partner
 The Social Pirates (1916) - Mona's Accomplice
 Whispering Smith (1916) - Murray Sinclair
 Medicine Bend (1916) - Murray Sinclair
 Judith of the Cumberlands (1916) - Blatchley Turrentine
 The Diamond Runners (1916) - Paul - the Brains of the I.D.B.
 The Manager of the B & A (1916) - Roger Oakley
 A Lass of the Lumberlands (1916)
 The Railroad Raiders (1917) - Steve Arnold
 The Further Adventures of Stingaree (1917) - Howie
 Rimrock Jones (1918) - Ike Bray
 With Hoops of Steel (1918)
 Smashing Through (1918) - Stevens
 The Tiger's Trail (1919, director)
 Lightning Bryce (1919) - Powder Solvang
 The Roaring Road (1926)
 The High Hand (1926) - Chris Doble
 The Fighting Ranger (1926)
 Battling Kid (1926)
 The Outlaw Express (1926) - Secretary
 Son of a Gun (1926)
 The Midnight Message (1926, director)
 Blue Streak O'Neil (1927)
 Rider of the Law (1927) - Henry Baker
 The Overland Stage (1927) - Hell-A-Poppin' Casey
 The Range Raiders (1927)
 The Man from Hard Pan (1927) - Larry Lackey
 Outlaw's Paradise (1927)
 The Range Riders (1927)
 The Devil's Saddle (1927) - 'Swig' Moran
 The Red Raiders (1927) - Sergeant Murphy
 The Valley of the Giants (1927) - Randeau
 Buttons (1927) - Slugger McGlue
 The Cossacks (1928) - Sitchi
 Lilac Time (1928) - (uncredited)
 The Rainbow (1929) - Pat
 The Lawless Legion (1929) - Ramirez
 The California Mail (1929) - Rowdy Ryan
 Tide of Empire (1929) - Poppy
 Sailor's Holiday (1929) - Jimmylegs
 Oh, Yeah! (1929) - Railroad-Yard Superintendent
 The Racketeer (1929) - Mehaffy
 His First Command (1929) - Sgt. Westbrook
 Officer O'Brien (1930) - Captain Antrim
 Lucky Larkin (1930) - Pete Brierson
 The Swellhead (1930) - Mugsy
 Mountain Justice (1930) - Lem Harland
 The Runaway Bride (1930) - Sergeant Daly
 Shadow of the Law (1930) - Pete Shore
 Hot Curves (1930) - 'Slug', Baseball Player
 Paradise Island (1930) - Beauty
 Borrowed Wives (1930) - Bull Morgan
 The Lottery Bride (1930) - Lottery Agent (uncredited)
 The Third Alarm (1930) - 'Beauty' Johnson
 The Single Sin (1931) - Slug
 The Secret Six (1931) - Nick Mizoski - the Gouger
 Kick In (1931) - Detective Whip Fogarty
 Sweepstakes (1931) - Cantina Bartender
 That's My Line (1931, Short) - Mexican Bandit
 The Public Defender (1931) - Doc
 Bad Company (1931) - Goldie's Butler
 The Secret Witness (1931) - Officer Brannigan (uncredited)
 Maker of Men (1931) - Gabby
 Panama Flo (1932) - Al
 State's Attorney (1932) - Captain Morgan
 My Pal, the King (1932) - Red
 The Thirteenth Guest (1932) - Detective Grump
 Hold 'Em Jail (1932) - Coach Butch
 The Phantom President (1932) - Sailor (uncredited)
 The Big Stampede (1932) - Arizona - Arizona
 Men Are Such Fools (1932) - Stiles
 Island of Lost Souls (1932) - Donahue
 Grand Slam (1933) - Canadian Bridge Player (uncredited)
 Out All Night (1933) - Henry (uncredited)
 Terror Aboard (1933) - Boatswain
 The Sphinx (1933) - Detective Terrence Aloysius Hogan
 Hold Your Man (1933) - Aubrey C. Mitchell (uncredited)
 Tugboat Annie (1933) - Sam
 Saturday's Millions (1933) - Doc Maloney, Trainer
 Day of Reckoning (1933) - Harry
 The Women in His Life (1933) - Paul
 Queen Christina (1933) - Swedish Soldier (uncredited)
 Nana (1934) - Nana's First Employer (uncredited)
 The Big Race (1934) - Skipper O'Neal
 The Line-Up (1934) - Detective Sergeant Doyle
 A Very Honorable Guy (1934) - Butler (uncredited)
 Sing and Like It (1934) - Tied Up Mug (uncredited)
 Charlie Chan's Courage (1934) - Minor Role
 Midnight Alibi (1934) - Babe the Butcher
 Take the Stand (1934) - Denny O'Brien
 Among the Missing (1934) - Police Capt. Bill Connors
 Tomorrow's Youth (1934) - Detective
 Sequoia (1934) - Bergman
 Romance in Manhattan (1935) - Joe - Policeman (uncredited)
 Maybe It's Love (1935) - Expressman (uncredited)
 Carnival (1935) - Policeman (uncredited)
 Shadow of Doubt (1935) - Police Lt. Jack Sackville
 Wilderness Mail (1935) - Jules - Henchman
 Mississippi (1935) - Hefty
 Star of Midnight (1935) - Detective Corbett (uncredited)
 The Case of the Curious Bride (1935) - Fibo Morgan - Florabelle's Cousin (uncredited)
 Public Hero No. 1 (1935) - Rufe Parker
 Calm Yourself (1935) - Detective Roscoe
 The Daring Young Man (1935) - Prison Guard (uncredited)
 The Gay Deception (1935) - Bell Captain
 Riffraff (1936) - Belcher
 It Had to Happen (1936) - Workman (uncredited)
 The Robin Hood of El Dorado (1936) - Wilson
 Mr. Deeds Goes to Town (1936) - 1st Deputy (uncredited)
 Blackmailer (1936) - Inspector Killian
 To Mary - with Love (1936) - Drunk
 I'd Give My Life (1936) - Conly
 The Gay Desperado (1936) - American Detective
 North of Nome (1936) - Carlson
 We Who Are About to Die (1937) - Tip Fuller
 Trouble in Morocco (1937) - Tiger Malone
 Song of the City (1937) - First Detective (uncredited)
 This Is My Affair (1937) - Bowler
 Angel's Holiday (1937) - Sergeant Murphy
 Fifty Roads to Town (1937) - Tom
 Slave Ship (1937) - Drunk
 You Can't Beat Love (1937) - Foreman Butch Mehaffey
 Super-Sleuth (1937) - Motorcycle Cop
 Wake Up and Live (1937) - McCabe
 The Legion of Missing Men (1937) - Muggsy
 You Can't Have Everything (1937) - Truck Driver (uncredited)
 She's No Lady (1937) - Cop
 Wife, Doctor and Nurse (1937) - Bill
 Danger – Love at Work (1937) - Police Officer
 The Lady Fights Back (1937) - Maloney
 Ali Baba Goes to Town (1937) - Captain
 Second Honeymoon (1937) - Dennis Huggins
 45 Fathers (1937) - Policeman (uncredited)
 In Old Chicago (1938) - Edward (Mitch) Mitchell
 No Time to Marry (1938) - Sergeant
 Rebecca of Sunnybrook Farm (1938) - Mug
 Island in the Sky (1938) - Happy
 Alexander's Ragtime Band (1938) - Bill Mulligan
 Josette (1938) - A. Adolphus Heyman
 Prison Break (1938) - Soapy
 My Lucky Star (1938) - Louie
 Hold That Co-ed (1938) - Slapsy
 The Last Express (1938) - Asst. Dist. Atty. Springer
 Secrets of a Nurse (1938) - Slice Cavanaugh
 Thanks for Everything (1938) - Guard
 Topper Takes a Trip (1938) - Bartender
 Cafe Society (1939) - Bartender
 Broadway Serenade (1939) - Reynolds
 The Kid from Kokomo (1939) - First Old Man in Fistfight
 It Could Happen to You (1939) - Sandy
 Each Dawn I Die (1939) - Garsky
 Bad Lands (1939) - Curly Tom
 Quick Millions (1939) - Sheriff
 On Your Toes (1939) - Variety Club Bartender (uncredited)
 Heaven with a Barbed Wire Fence (1939) - Empire State Building Guard (uncredited)
 Remember? (1939) - Policeman
 Gone with the Wind (1939) - the Yankee Deserter
 Castle on the Hudson (1940) - Guard (uncredited)
 Star Dust (1940) - Mac, Amalgamated Lab Tech
 Edison, the Man (1940) - Sheriff
 Torrid Zone (1940) - Daniels
 They Drive By Night (1940) - Pete Haig (uncredited)
 South to Karanga (1940) - Slats
 The Westerner (1940) - Chickenfoot
 Men Against the Sky (1940) - Mechanic (uncredited)
 Spring Parade (1940) - Headwaiter (uncredited)
 Tugboat Annie Sails Again (1940) - Pete
 Goin' Fishin' (1940, Short) - Bus conductor
 Street of Memories (1940) - Minor Role (uncredited)
 Bowery Boy (1940) - Blubber Mullins
 Tall, Dark and Handsome (1941) - Biff Sage
 Virginia (1941) - Thomas
 Petticoat Politics (1941) - Slats O'Dell
 The Great Mr. Nobody (1941) - Michael O'Connor
 Caught in the Draft (1941) - Sgt. Burns
 The Parson of Panamint (1941) - Jake Waldren
 This Woman is Mine (1941) - Second Mate Mumford
 Ellery Queen and the Murder Ring (1941) - Page
 Pardon My Stripes (1942) - Feets
 Sundown Jim (1942) - Broderick
 Night in New Orleans (1942) - Sergeant Casper Riordan
 Calaboose (1943) - Bartender Ed
 Young and Willing (1943) - First Cop
 Hi'ya, Chum (1943) - Archie Billings
 The Ox Bow Incident (1943) - Monty Smith
 Coney Island (1943) - Louie
 The Sky's the Limit (1943) - Dock Foreman (uncredited)
 Jack London (1943) - 'Lucky Luke' Lannigan
 December 7th: The Movie (1943) - World War I Ghost Soldier
 The Ghost That Walks Alone (1944) - Sheriff Slim Carson (uncredited)
 Summer Storm (1944) - Officer Orloff
 Greenwich Village (1944) - Milkman (scenes deleted)
 Barbary Coast Gent (1944) - Jake Compton
 Girl Rush (1944) - Muley
 Something for the Boys (1944) - Defense Plant Foreman (uncredited)
 The Big Show-Off (1945) - The Devil
 Her Lucky Night (1945) - Maloney (uncredited)
 Nob Hill (1945) - El Dorado Doorman (uncredited)
 Penthouse Rhythm (1945) - Police Desk Sergeant
 Scared Stiff (1945) - Sheriff
 Steppin' in Society (1945) - Cookie
 Midnight Manhunt (1945) - Murphy
 The Dolly Sisters (1945) - Tim Dowling (uncredited)
 Dakota (1945) - Captain Spotts
 Murder in the Music Hall (1946) - Hobarth
 The Virginian (1946) - Bartender (uncredited)
 In Old Sacramento (1946) - Stagecoach Driver
 Death Valley (1946) - Sergeant Dailey
 Plainsman and the Lady (1946) - Al
 Angel and the Badman (1947) - Frederick Carson
 Under California Skies (1947) - Lucky John Hawkins
 On Our Merry Way (1948) - Sheriff (uncredited)
 Madonna of the Desert (1948) - Pete Connors
 California Firebrand (1948) - Chuck Waggoner
 Who Killed Doc Robbin (1948) - Jailer
 Old Los Angeles (1948) - Bartender (uncredited)
 Heart of Virginia (1948) - Whit Galtry
 The Arizona Ranger (1948) - Ben Riddle
 Son of God's Country (1948) - Eli Walker
 Yellow Sky (1948) - Drunk (uncredited)
 Gun Smugglers (1949) - Sergeant Hasty Jones
 Prince of the Plains (1949) - Sheriff Hank Hartley
 Law of the Golden West (1949) - Otis Ellis
 Outcasts of the Trail (1949) - Doc Meadowlark
 South of Rio (1949) - Andy Weems
 San Antone Ambush (1949) - Happy Daniels
 Ranger of Cherokee Strip (1949) - Sheriff Jug Mason
 Pioneer Marshal (1949) - Huck Homer
 The Vanishing Westerner (1950) - Waldorf Worthington
 The Old Frontier (1950) - Skipper Horton
 The Missourians (1950) - Lawyer John Finn
 Million Dollar Pursuit (1951) - Ray Harvey
 Big Jim McLain (1952) - Mr. Lexiter
 Toughest Man in Arizona (1952) - Dalton
 The Sun Shines Bright (1953) - Army Sgt. Jimmy Bagby (final film role)

As director
 The Hazards of Helen (1914 serial) (uncredited)
 A Woman in the Web (1918 serial) 
 Play Straight or Fight (1918)
The Kingfisher's Roost (1921)
 The Crow's Nest (1922)
 Battling Bunyan (1924)
 Folly of Youth (1925)
 The Law of the Snow Country (1926)
 Blue Streak O'Neil (1926)
 The Roaring Road (1926)
 Rider of the Law (1927)

References
 
 Rothel, David. 1984. Those Great Cowboy Sidekicks.  Scarecrow Press, Metuchen, New Jersey.

External links

 , with a wardrobe still from Gone With the Wind

1888 births
1953 deaths
American male film actors
American male silent film actors
Suicides in California
20th-century American male actors
People from Tulare County, California
People from Reedley, California
Film directors from California
1953 suicides
Male Western (genre) film actors